

See also

International Phonetic Alphabet chart for English dialects
X-SAMPA

SAMPA
English phonology